WWDG may refer to:

 WWDG-CD, a low-power television station (channel 28, virtual 12) licensed to serve Rome, New York, United States
 WCIS-FM, a radio station (105.1 FM) licensed to serve Deruyter, New York, which held the call sign WWDG from 2003 to 2009